USS Benham (DD-397) was the lead ship of her class of destroyers and the second ship of the United States Navy to be named for Andrew Ellicot Kennedy Benham. She missed the Attack on Pearl Harbor, being an escort for the aircraft carrier  on her way to Midway Atoll at the time. She also served off Hawaii during the Doolittle raid, rescued survivors from several ships, and operated during the Battle of Midway and the landings on Guadalcanal, among other missions. She was torpedoed and rendered unusable, for which she was sunk at the end of 1942.

Construction
Benham was laid down on 1 September 1936 by Federal Shipbuilding and Dry Dock Company at their yard in Kearny, New Jersey. The destroyer was launched on 16 April 1938 and sponsored by Mrs. A. I. Dorr, grandniece of Rear Admiral Benham. Benham was commissioned on 2 February 1939 with Lieutenant Commander T. F. Darden in command.

Service history
Assigned to the U.S. Atlantic Fleet, Benham patrolled off Newfoundland during most of 1939 and then shifted to the Gulf of Mexico. Ordered to the Pacific, she arrived at Pearl Harbor 14 April 1940. After alternating between Californian and Hawaiian waters, the destroyer served as an escort for  during the delivery of Marine planes to Midway Atoll on 28 November to 8 December 1941, thus missing the Japanese attack on Pearl Harbor. Benham served with Enterprise and  task forces off Hawaii and with Task Force 16 during the Doolittle raid on Tokyo, 8 to 25 April 1942. She continued operating with TF 16 through the Battle of Midway, 3 to 6 June, during which she rescued 720 survivors from the aircraft carrier  and 188 from the destroyer ; landings on Guadalcanal and Tulagi, 7 to 9 August, and the Battle of the Eastern Solomons, 23 to 25 August.

Benham joined Task Force 64 on 15 October as a part of the naval covering force off Guadalcanal. During 14–15 November, she took part in the Naval Battle of Guadalcanal, and at 00:38 on 15 November she took a single torpedo in her bow which severed everything forward of her bridge. Benham stayed afloat, making slow headway towards Guadalcanal during the 15th but, by 16:37, further progress was impossible and her crew abandoned ship.  picked up the survivors, and sank the hulk at 19:38 by shell-fire.

Honors
Benham received five battle stars for her service in World War II.

References

Brown, David. Warship Losses of World War Two. Arms and Armour, London, Great Britain, 1990.  .

External links

navsource.org: USS Benham
hazegray.org: USS Benham

 

Benham-class destroyers
World War II destroyers of the United States
Shipwrecks in Ironbottom Sound
Ships built in Kearny, New Jersey
1938 ships
Maritime incidents in November 1942
1992 archaeological discoveries